Events from the year 1800 in Denmark.

Incumbents
 Monarch – Christian VII
 Prime minister – Christian Günther von Bernstorff

Events
 4 July – St. Nicolas Church, one of the four Medieval churches in Copenhagen, is closed.
 16 December – Denmark enters a pact of neutrality with Sweden and Russia, and on 18 December also with Prussia.

Date unknown
 A semaphore line, also known as an optical telegraph, is established between Copenhagen and Schleswig, with 23 reply stations across Zealand, Funen and Als.
 Kronprinsessegade is established in Copenhagen.
 Conrad Malte-Brun is sent into exile for his pamphlets which contained outright criticism of the government, something which the new censorship laws forbade.

Births
 8 March – Johan Laurentz Jensen, painter (died 1856)
 5 September – Michael Gottlieb Bindesbøll, architect (died 1856)
 31 October – Peter Lassen, rancher in the United States, namesake of Lassen County, California (died 1859)
 3 November – Rasmus Carl Stæger, judge, financial advisor to the government, entomologist (died 1875)
 4 December – Emil Aarestrup, poet (died 1856)

Deaths
27 April – Christian Jensen Mørup, architect (born 1732)

References